Case of the Naves Brothers is a 1967 Brazilian drama film directed by Luis Sérgio Person. Based on a book by João Alamy Filho, the Naves brothers' lawyer, it tells the story of Joaquim and Sebastião Naves, who were arrested during the Estado Novo dictatorship and after being tortured confessed to a crime they did not commit. It was entered into the 5th Moscow International Film Festival. The film was also selected as the Brazilian entry for the Best Foreign Language Film at the 40th Academy Awards, but was not accepted as a nominee.

Cast
 Raul Cortez as Joaquim Naves
 Juca de Oliveira as Sebastião Naves
 Anselmo Duarte as Deputy commissioner
 John Herbert as Dr. Alamy
 Sérgio Hingst as judge
 Lélia Abramo as Donana
 Júlia Miranda as Joaquim's wife
 Cacilda Lanuza as Sebastião's wife
 Hiltrud Holz

See also
 List of submissions to the 40th Academy Awards for Best Foreign Language Film
 List of Brazilian submissions for the Academy Award for Best Foreign Language Film

References

External links
 

1967 drama films
1967 films
1960s Portuguese-language films
Brazilian black-and-white films
Brazilian drama films
Films directed by Luis Sérgio Person
Films set in 1937
Films set in 1952
Films about miscarriage of justice
Torture in films